The Hummingbird is a 2019 novel by Sandro Veronesi. The novel is presented in fragments with a nonlinear narrative structure and follows the tumultuous life of ophthalmologist Marco Carrera. The novel won the prestigious Strega Prize (2020).

Reception 
In a starred review, Publishers Weekly called the novel "cleverly structured like a jigsaw puzzle", writing, "A senseless tragedy, splashes of levity, and unexpected poignancy bring this to a moving conclusion. Veronesi's dark modern chronicle shimmers with intelligence and flashes of pathos."

Kirkus Reviews called it an "intriguing but ultimately disappointing experiment in fictional biography" and criticised Veronesi's depictions of women.

In 2020, the novel won the prestigious Strega Prize. Veronesi previously won the Strega in 2006 for his novel

Film adaptation 

The novel has been adapted into a film of the same name by director Francesca Archibugi. The film stars Pierfrancesco Favino as Marco, Bérénice Bejo as Luisa, Kasia Smutniak as Marina and Benedetta Porcaroli as Adele.

References 

2019 novels
21st-century Italian novels
Nonlinear narrative novels
Novels set in Italy
Strega Prize-winning works
Novels by Sandro Veronesi
Italian novels adapted into films